Brookfield Place (previously named and still commonly referred to as the World Financial Center) is a shopping center and office building complex in the New York City borough of Manhattan. It is located in the Battery Park City neighborhood, across West Street from the World Trade Center, and overlooks the Hudson River. The complex is currently owned and managed by Brookfield Properties, a subsidiary of Brookfield Asset Management.

History 

Designed by architect César Pelli, with Adamson Associates, the World Financial Center complex was built by Olympia and York from 1983 to 1988 on the landfill used to build Battery Park City. 

During the September 11 attacks in 2001, debris severely damaged the lobby and lower floors' granite cladding and glass. It has since been fully restored and significant repairs were made to the other buildings in the complex. The Winter Garden Atrium received major structural damage to its glass and steel frame, but ceremonially reopened on September 11, 2002.

After the attacks, the World Financial Center underwent a $250 million renovation and expansion project, in conjunction with the construction of a new east-west passageway linking the complex with the World Trade Center site. The project included a transit pavilion to be built as an extension of the existing Winter Garden Atrium, on the West Street side. Preliminary plans called for the demolition of the Grand Staircase, which was the main focal entry point to Winter Garden and the waterfront, as it connected to the Vesey Street pedestrian bridge adjacent to the original World Trade Center. The Grand Staircase has also been used as an amphitheater; thus, the plans for demolition had outraged residents, who promptly appealed for its preservation in the latest redevelopment plans. The transit pavilion opened in 2013, and is located at 100 West Street.

Leasable space on the lower floors of the office towers underwent conversions and expansion to accommodate new retail. One notable example is 2 Brookfield Place: a European-style marketplace and dining terrace opened in 2013. The space between 3 and 4 Brookfield Place, at 225 Vesey Street, which contained retail, expanded to accommodate in‑line retail and high-end fashion retail, according to the plans and renderings. With some restaurants and retail temporarily closed due to construction, a food truck court was in operation beginning in early 2012 on North End Avenue. Various food trucks that operate around New York City, serving a variety of foods, service the Brookfield Place/Battery Park City area five days a week during lunch hours. A new 2,000-seat food court comprising existing restaurants, such as Le District and Hudson Eats, and new restaurants, opened in stages between November 2014 and March 2015; the food area is projected to generate about $120 million of revenue annually. Overall, the intent is to drive more tourism in the area with the retail and the new access to the passageway under West Street. It is also being developed as a catalyst to integrate and drive development in the adjacent largely residential Battery Park City area.

Following expansion, the entire World Financial Center complex was renamed Brookfield Place, in conjunction with similar complexes in Toronto, Calgary, and Perth owned by Brookfield. The name change took place in 2014.

Ownership 
Brookfield Place is owned by Toronto-based Brookfield Asset Management, except for the space occupied by American Express, which is owned by the American Express Company. 250 Vesey Street serves as the United States headquarters for Brookfield Asset Management. Brookfield Place has its own zip code, 10281. The buildings' original developer was Olympia and York, also based in Toronto.

Notable tenants 
Brookfield Place has been home to offices of various companies including Merrill Lynch, RBC Capital Markets, Nomura Group, American Express, Bank of New York Mellon, Jane Street Capital, Time Inc. 95.5 K-LOVE, 96.7 Air1, and Brookfield Asset Management. In 2014, the complex was given its current name following the completion of extensive renovations. Brookfield Place is also the home of College Board, the nonprofit managing both Advanced Placement and the SAT.

List of buildings 

The Winter Garden Atrium is a  glass domed pavilion housing various plants, trees and flowers, also shopping areas, cafes (located between buildings 2 and 3), rebuilt 2002 after terrorist attacks on September 11, 2001. The pavilion also exhibits a range of contemporary artists including Reyna Noriega, Julia Whitney Barnes, Tatiana Arocha, Anne Beffel, Jane Benson, Curtis Cuffie, Charles Goldman, Elke Lehmann, Pia Lindman, Brian P. McGrath, Andrea Ray, and Alex Villar.

Gallery

References

External links

 
American Express
Battery Park City
Brookfield Properties buildings
César Pelli buildings
Office buildings completed in 1988
Office buildings in Manhattan
Shopping malls in New York City
World Financial Centers
Postmodern architecture in New York City